The Historic Trails Award is an award of the Boy Scouts of America (BSA) designed to promote the ideals of Scouting and in Scoutcraft, citizenship, self-reliance, and appreciation of national history. It is awarded for studying about,  hiking or camping along, or performing a service project on a historic trail.  The award may be earned by Boy Scouts, Varsity Scouts, Venturers and leaders.

Award
The Historic Trails Award is presented as a cloth or leather patch and as a decal.  The award may not be worn on the uniform but is affixed to equipment such as backpacks or vehicles, or sewn onto items such as patch vests or blankets. The Historic Trails Award was established in April 1956, along with the 50-Miler Award.

Requirements
Although the Historic Trails Award is an individual award, the requirements are performed as a group, where groups may be the troop, team or crew or a provisional group composed of members of various units. The trip must be properly planned and may include other opportunities for advancement and recognition.

Notes

External links
 BSA recognizes National Parks and Recreation Month

Advancement and recognition in the Boy Scouts of America